A bacon, egg and cheese sandwich is a breakfast sandwich popular in the United States and Canada. It is made with bacon, eggs (typically fried or scrambled), cheese and bread, which may be buttered and toasted. Many similar sandwiches exist, substituting alternate meat products for the bacon or using different varieties of cheese or bread.

Variations 

A version has been adapted to make a low-carbohydrate meal. In the United States, the bacon egg and cheese sandwich has also been modified into a prepackaged food product as a Hot Pocket ( and 7 grams of fat) and a Lean Pocket ( and 4.5 grams of fat).

See also 

 Bacon sandwich
 List of sandwiches

References 

Breakfast sandwiches
American sandwiches
Bacon sandwiches
Cheese sandwiches
Egg sandwiches
Food combinations